This is a list of actors who were considered for the role of James Bond, both officially (auditioned by the film producers) and unofficially (supported by fans and celebrities) but did not play the role of agent 007. The separate list of James Bond films details the actors who have played the role of agent 007.

Considered but not chosen
Actors who have come under consideration for the role of James Bond but were not chosen.

Considered but declined the role
Actors who have come under consideration for the role of James Bond but have declined the offer for various reasons.

Both Timothy Dalton and Pierce Brosnan were linked to the role at least a decade before taking it but declined for various reasons.

Dalton was offered the role in 1967 at the age of 21 and finally took the role 20 years later. Dalton denied the offer again in 1979 because he felt the plot directions of the Bond films were becoming less realistic and more dependent on gadgetry and repeated plot formulas.

Both Roger Moore and Dalton also did not accept the role for On Her Majesty's Secret Service, feeling that they did not want to be viewed as the man who replaced Sean Connery. Pierce Brosnan was chosen as Bond for The Living Daylights, but had to leave the role because the show Remington Steele had been renewed, as Brosnan played the lead role. The role then went to Dalton. Brosnan made his debut as Bond in GoldenEye.

Considered but chosen for a different role in a Bond film
The following actors were considered for the role of James Bond, but were cast as supporting or opposing characters; in the case of Colin Salmon, consideration as Bond came after his appearances in the films.

Potential successors to Pierce Brosnan and Daniel Craig

Colin Salmon was also rumoured to be one of many actors to replace Pierce Brosnan as James Bond, a role that would go to Daniel Craig. Had he been chosen for the role, Salmon would have been the first black Bond. In 2013 Brosnan backed Salmon as a possible successor to Craig, but Craig kept the role until 2021.  As Craig exited, Brosnan endorsed Regé-Jean Page, who if contracted would be the first actor of colour to portray Bond; British actors Henry Cavill and George MacKay were reportedly also being considered to succeed Craig.

See also
 Outline of James Bond

References

Actors considered for the James Bond character
Bond, James